Çatistë is one of the six villages of the former commune of Pogon, in southern Albania. At the 2015 local government reform it became part of the municipality Dropull. According to a 2014 report by the Albanian government, there were 585 ethnic Greeks in the village.

See also
Greeks in Albania

References

Populated places in Dropull
Greek communities in Albania